Danon Smash ( foaled 6 March 2015) is a Japanese Thoroughbred racehorse best known for his performances in sprint races. He won twice as a juvenile in 2017 and took two more races, including the Grade 3 Keihan Hai as a three-year-old in the following year. In 2019 he began to emerge as a top-class sprinter as he recorded further Grade 3 victories in the Silk Road Stakes and the Keeneland Cup as well as running third in the Grade 1 Sprinters Stakes. He improved again as a five-year-old when he won the Ocean Stakes, Keio Hai Spring Cup and Centaur Stakes in Japan and the Group 1 Hong Kong Sprint in Hong Kong. On his first run of 2021 he won the Takamatsunomiya Kinen at the third attempt.

Background
Danon Smash is a bay horse with a white star bred in Japan by K I Farm. During his track career he carried the red and white colours of Danox Co Ltd the business software enterprise of his owner Masahiro Noda, and was trained by Takayuki Yasuda. 

Danon Smash was from the first crop of foals sired by Lord Kanaloa, an outstanding sprinter-miler who was the 2013 Japanese Horse of the Year. Lord Kanaloa's other progeny include Almond Eye, Saturnalia and Tagaloa. Danon Smash's dam Spinning Wildcat was a Kentucky-bred mare who won one minor race from six starts in the United States. On 4 November 2013 as a four-year-old she was put up for auction at the Fasig-Tipton Sale at Lexington, Kentucky and was bought by K I Farm for $600,000. Spinning Wildcat was a half-sister to the Breeders' Cup Mile winner War Chant, being a daughter of the exceptional racemare Hollywood Wildcat whose wins included the Breeders' Cup Distaff, Hollywood Oaks and Gamely Handicap.

Racing career

2017: two-year-old season
Danon Smash began his racing career by finishing second in a contest for previously unraced juveniles over 1400 metres on firm ground at Niigata Racecourse on 2 September. Three weeks later he recorded his first success as he won a maiden race over the same distance at Hanshin Racecourse. On 15 October he followed up at Kyoto Racecourse by taking the Momiji Stakes. The colt was then moved up sharply in class for the Grade 1 Asahi Hai Futurity Stakes over 1600 metres at Hanshin on 17 December when he started at odds of 7.7/1 and finished fifth, four and a half lengths behind the winner Danon Premium as he finished well after recovering from a poor start.

2018: three-year-old season
On his first run as a three-year-old Danon Smash started favourite for the Grade 3 Falcon Stakes at Chukyo Racecourse on 17 March but finished seventh behind Mr Melody after racing towards the rear of the field for most of the 1400 metre trip. In the Arlington Cup over 1600 metres at Hanshin in April he was ridden closer to the lead before coming home fifth behind Tower of London, finishing two and a half lengths behind the winner. In the Grade 1 NHK Mile Cup at Tokyo Racecourse in May he raced in second place for most of the way before tiring in the closing stages and finishing seventh of the eighteen runners behind Keiai Nautique.

Danon Smash was dropped back to sprint distances for his three remaining starts of 2018, starting with the Hakodate Nikkan Sport Hai at Hakodate Racecourse in July when he won from Amalfi Coast and fourteen others. At Sapporo Racecourse in August he was matched against older horses for the first time and ran second to the five-year-old mare Nac Venus in the Grade 3 Keeneland Cup. The colt ended his season in the Grade 3 Keihan Hai over 1200 metres at Kyoto Racecourse in which he was ridden by Yuichi Kitamura and started the 2.4/1 favourite in an eighteen-runner field. After settling behind the leaders Danon Smash took the lead in the straight and won by one and three quarter lengths from the seven-year-old gelding Nine Tails.

2019: four-year-old season
Danon Smash began his third campaign by starting favourite the Grade 3 Silk Road Stakes over 1200 metres at Chukyo on 27 January. With Kitamura in the saddle he raced in fifth before finishing strongly to win by one and a quarter lengths from Estitato. Yasuda later commented "I was worried when he turned into the stretch. I even thought he’d lost the race there but he was able to rally... I think he will still improve". When stepped up to Grade 1 class for the Takamatsunomiya Kinen at Chukyo in March he started favourite but came home fourth behind Mr Melody, Seiun Kosei and Shonan Anthem, beaten just over a length by the winner.

Yuga Kadada took over as Danaon Smash's jockey for his next two races. After an absence of five months, the horse returned for a second attempt at the Keeneland Cup on 25 August and went off the 1.3/1 favourite in an eighteen-runner field. After settling in sixth place as Nac Venus set the pace he took the lead in the straight and won by a length from Tower of London. Five weeks later the colt started favourite for the Group 1 Sprinters Stakes at Nakayama Racecourse and produced his customary late run but was unable to overhaul the leaders and finished a close third, beaten half a length and a neck by Tower of London and Mozu Superflare. For his final run of 2019 Danon Smash was sent to Hong Kong's Sha Tin Racecourse to contest the Hong Kong Sprint on 9 December and came home eighth of the twelve runners behind the locally-trained Beat The Clock, beaten two and three quarter lengths by the winner.

2020: five-year-old season

On his first appearance as a five-year-old, Danon Smash was partnered by Kawada in the Grade 3 Ocean Stakes at Nakayama on 7 March. Going off favourite, he recovered from a poor start to race in fourth place behind the outsider Engelchein before taking the lead in the straight and winning by one and a half lengths from Nac Venus, with Tower of London three lengths back in third place. Yasuda commented "I was worried for a moment at the break but he picked it up immediately. Going in to the straight he looked to still have a lot left and I thought he had a chance if he got a clean run. With a furlong left he was still going strong". In his second attempt to win the Takamatsunomiya Kinen on 29 April, the horse started third favourite but "never fired" on the yielding ground and came home tenth behind Kurino Gaudi. The "winner" was subsequently disqualified for causing interference and the race was awarded to Mozu Superflare.

Danon Smash was then stepped up in trip for Grade 2 Keio Hai Spring Cup over 1400 metres at Tokyo on 16 May in which he was ridden by the Australian jocken Damian Lane and started the 3.9/1 second favourite behind Tower of London. In a change of tactics he led from the start and won by one and a quarter lengths from the Mile Championship winner Stelvio. After the race Yasuda said "he moved quickly to the top from the gate and even though he was chased by the eventual runnerup the whole way, he was able to pull away at the end. It was a strong race and I don’t think it gets any better." He was moved up in distance again for a very strong renewal 1600 metre Yasuda Kinen on 7 June. Starting a 73/1 outsider he led for most of the way before tiring in the last 200 metres and coming home eighth behind Gran Alegria.

After a three month summer break, Danon Smash returned to the track in the Grade 2 Centaur Stakes at Chukyo on 13 September when he was partnered by Kosei Miura and started the 2/1 favourite against sixteen opponents including Mr Melody, Seiun Kosei and Kurino Gaudi. After settling in fourth place behind the front-running Seiun Kosai he gained the advantage in the closing stages and won by a length and a neck from Meisho Glocke and Mr Melody. On 4 October at Nakayama, the horse ran for the second time in the Sprinters Stakes and stayed on well in the straight to take second place behind Gran Alegria, beaten two lengths by the winner.

As in the previous year, Danon Smash ended his season at Sha Tin and was ridden by Ryan Moore as he contested his second Hong Kong Sprint on 13 December. He started a 21.8/1 outsider in a fourteen-runner field which also included Tower of London, Hot King Prawn (Jockey Club Sprint), Classique Legend, Voyage Warrior (2020 Sprint Cup) and Rattan (2019 Sprint Cup). After racing in mid-division, Danon Smash made rapid progress on the outside, took the lead inside the last 200 metres and "kept on well" to win by a length from the locally-trained outsider Jolly Banner. After the race Moore said "He broke really well, ran on the pace feeling good, and I was able to slot into a lovely spot. When the pace steadied around the bend, I was able to just move out and keep moving forward and he got there in plenty of time. He was very tough and very honest – a pleasure to ride." Yasuda, who was unable to travel to Hong Kong owing to COVID-19 restrictions commented "I actually wasn’t able to watch it live and before I could see the video all these people started calling me saying ‘Congratulations!’ so when I did watch I knew winning was a sure thing. It couldn’t be better."

2021: six-year-old season
On his return from Japan Danon Smash had to go into quarantine and Yasuda opted to go straight for the Takamatsunomiya Kinen on 28 March without a prep race. Ridden by Kawada, he started the 5/1 second choice in the betting behind Resistencia in field of eighteen runners which also included Lauda Sion, Indy Champ, Danon Fantasy and Mozu Superflare. In a race run on yielding ground, Danon Smash was positioned on the outside in tenth place as Mozu Superflare set the pace, before making steady progress in the straight. He joined the leaders 100 metres from the finish and prevailed by a neck from Resistencia with Indy Champ a further neck away in third place. After the race Kawada said "I knew that the ground condition was going to be the key factor but I decided not to make any plan and let the horse race where he wants to... He responded really well at the fourth corner and, although there was a long duel in the stretch, he showed his strength at the end. Last year's result was very disappointing so I’m really glad he was able to register his first Grade 1 title in Japan." On 25 April Danon Smash made a third trip to Hong Kong to contest the Group 1 Chairman's Sprint Prize, but despite starting the 6/5 favourite he never looked likely to win and came home sixth behind the improving four-year-old Wellington.

Pedigree

Danon Smash is inbred 4 × 4 to Mr Prospector, meaning that this stallion appears twice in the fourth generation of his pedigree.

References

2015 racehorse births
Racehorses bred in Japan
Racehorses trained in Japan
Thoroughbred family 4-r